Tetsurō Fujiwara is a Japanese physician. In 1996 he was awarded the King Faisal International Prize in Medicine together with Bengt Robertson for contributions to the understanding of neonatal medicine.

References

1931 births
Biography articles needing translation from German Wikipedia
Living people